Henry Tennant may refer to:

Henry Tennant (railway administrator) (1823–1910), British railway administrator
Henry Tennant (Canadian politician) (1839–?), political figure in Manitoba
Henry Tennant (MP), MP for Hastings